Anavirga is a genus of three anamorphic fungi in the family Vibrisseaceae. All three species are known from Europe.

References

External links

Helotiales genera